Unisonic may refer to:

Unisonic (band), German hard rock band fronted by Michael Kiske
Unisonic (album), eponymous 2012 album by hard rock band Unisonic
Unisonic Products Corporation, American manufacturing company